Torsten Eriksson (20 February 1891 – 29 July 1979) was a Swedish diver. He competed in the men's plain high diving event at the 1912 Summer Olympics.

References

1891 births
1979 deaths
Swedish male divers
Olympic divers of Sweden
Divers at the 1912 Summer Olympics
Sportspeople from Örebro